Clarence Turner may refer to:
 Clarence J. A. Turner (1893–1957), American jockey
 Clarence W. Turner (1866–1939), American lawyer, politician